Iancu Țucărman (30 October 1922 – 8 January 2021) was a Romanian Jewish agricultural engineer and survivor of the Holocaust and the Iași pogrom. He was the penultimate survivor of the "Death's Train" that was used to deport Jews from the Iași railway station after Leonard Zăicescu. Țucărman was buried at the Giurgiului Jewish Cemetery of Bucharest on 11 January 2021.

Țucărman received several awards and honours in his lifetime. In 2007, President of Romania Traian Băsescu gave him the National Order of Merit. Later, in 2011, Țucărman was given honorary citizenship of the city of Iași. Finally, in 2016, Romanian President Klaus Iohannis gave him the National Order of Faithful Service in the rank of "Knight".

He died on 8 January 2021, at age 98, after getting infected by COVID-19 during the COVID-19 pandemic in Romania.

See also
 List of Holocaust survivors
 History of the Jews in Romania
 Holocaust trains

References

1922 births
2021 deaths
People from Iași
Moldavian Jews
Romanian agronomists
Holocaust survivors
Recipients of the National Order of Merit (Romania)
Recipients of the National Order of Faithful Service
Deaths from the COVID-19 pandemic in Romania